The 1942 United States Senate election in Montana took place on November 3, 1942. Incumbent United States Senator James E. Murray, who was first elected to the Senate in a special election in 1934 and was re-elected in 1936, ran for re-election. Following his victory in a competitive Democratic primary, Murray advanced to the general election, where he was opposed by former United States Attorney for the District of Montana Wellington D. Rankin, the Republican nominee and brother of representative Jeannette Rankin. In a closely fought election, Murray narrowly defeated Rankin to win re-election to his third term and his second full term in the Senate.

Democratic primary

Candidates
James E. Murray, incumbent United States Senator
Joseph P. Monaghan, former United States Congressman from Montana's 1st congressional district, 1936 independent candidate for the United States Senate

Results

Republican primary

Candidates
Wellington D. Rankin, former United States Attorney for the District of Montana, former Attorney General of Montana
Charles R. Dawley, United States Army veteran
Jacob Thorkelson, former United States Congressman from Montana's 1st congressional district

Results

General election

Results

References

Montana
1942
1942 Montana elections